Phantasy is a British independent record label established in London, England, and founded in 2007 by the DJ and producer, Erol Alkan. Its current roster includes  Connan Mockasin, Daniel Avery,  James Welsh, Ghost Culture, Babe, Terror, U, Future Four, Cowboy Rhythmbox and Alkan himself, while the label has previously released material from Late Of The Pier, Chilly Gonzales, LA Priest, Boys Noize & Erol Alkan, Babe, Terror, Primary 1, Fan Death, Paul Chambers, Dance Area, Riton & Primary 1, Boris Dlugosch, Tom Rowlands (of The Chemical Brothers), Future Four, In Flagranti, and Nadia Ksaiba.

Discography

See also
List of record labels

References

External links
Official Website
Facebook
Twitter
Instagram
Soundcloud
Youtube

British independent record labels
Record labels established in 2007